Prem Nagar is a 1974 Indian Hindi-language romantic drama film, produced by D. Ramanaidu, directed by K. S. Prakash Rao, and starring Rajesh Khanna, Hema Malini, Aruna Irani, Ashok Kumar, Kamini Kaushal, Prem Chopra, Asrani and Jagdeep. Actor David was in negative role in the film plotting how to fool the prince Karan by robbing off his wealth and transfer to his brother. The music is by Sachin Dev Burman. Box Office India declared the film a Super hit. The box office standing for the year was number 4.

The film is a remake of the Telugu film, Prema Nagar, released in 1971.

Plot 
Karan Singh lives a wealthy lifestyle in a palace along with his widowed mother, an elder brother, Shamsher, his wife and daughter. His mother, Rani Maa, spending most of her time playing cards, left his upbringing to his nanny. As a result, Karan ended up believing her to be his real mother. Now grown up and turned into a womanizer and an alcoholic, he comes to the rescue of a former air hostess, Lata, who is being molested by her boss. Subsequently, he hires her as his secretary and allows her family to move into one of his cottages. Progressively, Lata attempts to change his bad habits. She initially meets with opposition, but eventually succeeds and they fall in love. Karan even builds a mansion and names it "Prem Nagar" ("city of love"). However, their romance is shattered when Lata is accused of interfering in palace affairs, and later, of stealing a valuable necklace. So, a much humiliated Lata and her family move out.

Later on, Karan finds out the truth about Lata's innocence but it is already too late, and Lata will never return to him due to his initial distrust. Consequently, Karan's health worsens as he struggles with his addiction.

Cast
 Kamini Kaushal 	          - Rani Maa, mother of Karan and Shamsher
 Ashok Kumar                 - Upendra Singh, father of Karan and Shamsher, deceased
 Prem Chopra                 - Shamsher Singh ("Badey Kunver"), Karan's elder brother
 Bindu       - Shamsher's wife
 Rajesh Khanna               - Karan Singh ("Chhotey Kunver"), hero of the film
 Hema Malini                 - Lata, heroine
 Sulochana Latkar            - Lata's Mother (as Sulochana)
 Nazir Hussain               - Lata's Father 
 Ramesh Deo                  - Lata's Brother 
 Manmohan (actor)            - Lata's lecherous boss
 Asrani                      - Takhatram
 Aruna Irani                 - Sitara
 Nana Palshikar 
 David

Soundtrack

RD Burman had worked on and completed some songs for the film for his father, as his father was still rehabilitating from his stroke during the preproduction of the film.

Awards and nominations
 Filmfare Best Cinematographer Award — A. Vincent
 Filmfare Nomination for Best Actor — Rajesh Khanna
 Filmfare Nomination for Best Actress — Hema Malini
 Filmfare Nomination for Best Music — Sachin Dev Burman

Reception 
The Hindu newspaper in its review of the film in 2015 quoted "Khanna is a perfect choice for the role, the drunkard scion of a royal family, blessed with a heart of gold.Technically the film scores highly on all spheres.Editing by K.A. Marthand and J. Narasimha Rao is slick and keeps the story moving at a steady pace, with no room for slackness." The Hansindia site noted that Khanna had never shied away from portraying roles that were slightly off the regular path and ‘Prem Nagar’ featured him as a decadent prince, Karan, who happily idles away his life as playboy. During the premier of the film, after watching the film Raj Kapoor kissed Khanna's hands and complimented him for the way he used them like swords in the climax. ‘Prem Nagar’ was considered special by Khanna himself, as it featured his favourite song, “Yeh laal rang” sung by his ‘voice’ Kishore Kumar.

References

External links 
 

Films scored by S. D. Burman
1974 films
1974 romantic drama films
Indian romantic drama films
1970s Hindi-language films
Hindi remakes of Telugu films
Films directed by K. S. Prakash Rao
Suresh Productions films